Valentin Kasabov (6 February 1958 – 17 December 2020) was a Bulgarian politician.

From 2014 to till his death, he served as a member of the National Assembly of Bulgaria representing the Patriotic Front.

Kasabov died from COVID-19 in Sofia on 17 December 2020, aged 62.

References 

1958 births
2020 deaths
Deaths from the COVID-19 pandemic in Bulgaria
Members of the National Assembly (Bulgaria)